Carla Cametti PD is a six-part Australian television crime series that was announced in April 2008 and first screened on SBS TV on 8 January 2009. The series of six episodes was produced by Buon Giorno Productions Pty Ltd.

The show revolves around a young female Italian-Australian private detective named Carla Cametti who is investigating her own mafia family. Carla is played by Diana Glenn.

The DVD has been released in Region 4 only.

Cast
Diana Glenn as Carla Cametti PD
Vince Colosimo as Senior Detective Luciano Gandolfi
Nicole da Silva as Lisa Testro
Robert Mammone as Tony Cametti
Sullivan Stapleton as Matt Brodie
Daniella Farinacci as Teresa Cametti
Dina Panozzo as Angela Cametti
Alfredo Malabello as Leo Cametti
Tony Poli as Joe Testro
Jude Beaumont as Amanda Cartlin
Christine Kaman as Nonna
Julie Eckersley as Georgina Kavel

Guests
Angus Grant as Brad Greene
Jared Daperis as Jonno Carroll
Christine Keogh as Bev
Matt Boesenberg as hitman Sean Hamley

Episodes

References

External links
 
 Carla Cametti PD at Tubi.com (all 6 episodes viewable) 

2009 Australian television series debuts
2009 Australian television series endings
Australian drama television series
Television shows set in Victoria (Australia)
Special Broadcasting Service original programming